

Events

Pre-1600
 307 – Jin Huaidi becomes emperor of China in succession to his father, Jin Huidi, despite a challenge from his uncle, Sima Ying.
 871 – Æthelred I and Alfred the Great lead a West Saxon army to repel an invasion by Danelaw Vikings.
1297 – François Grimaldi, disguised as a monk, leads his men to capture the fortress protecting the Rock of Monaco, establishing his family as the rulers of Monaco.
1454 – The papal bull Romanus Pontifex awards the Kingdom of Portugal exclusive trade and colonization rights to all of Africa south of Cape Bojador.
1499 – Louis XII of France marries Anne of Brittany in accordance with a law set by his predecessor, Charles VIII.
1547 – The first Lithuanian-language book, the Catechism of Martynas Mažvydas, is published in Königsberg.

1601–1900
1735 – The premiere of George Frideric Handel's Ariodante takes place at the Royal Opera House, Covent Garden.
1746 – Second Jacobite rising: Bonnie Prince Charlie occupies Stirling.
1790 – George Washington delivers the first State of the Union address in New York City.
1806 – The Dutch Cape Colony in southern Africa becomes the British Cape Colony as a result of the Battle of Blaauwberg.
1811 – Charles Deslondes leads an unsuccessful slave revolt in the North American settlements of St. Charles and St. James, Louisiana.
1815 – War of 1812: Battle of New Orleans: Andrew Jackson leads American forces in victory over the British.
1828 – The Democratic Party of the United States is organized.
1835 – US President Andrew Jackson announces a celebratory dinner after having reduced the United States national debt to zero for the only time.
1863 – American Civil War: Second Battle of Springfield.
1867 – The United States Congress passes the bill to allow African American men the right to vote in Washington, D.C.
1877 – Crazy Horse and his warriors fight their last battle against the United States Cavalry at Wolf Mountain, Montana Territory.
1889 – Herman Hollerith is issued US patent #395,791 for the 'Art of Applying Statistics' — his punched card calculator.
1900 – President William McKinley  places Alaska under military rule.

1901–present
1912 – The African National Congress is founded, under the name South African Native National Congress (SANNC). 
1918 – U.S. President Woodrow Wilson announces his "Fourteen Points" as conditions for ending World War I.
1920 – The steel strike of 1919 ends in failure for the Amalgamated Association of Iron, Steel and Tin Workers labor union.
1926 – Crown Prince Nguyễn Phúc Vĩnh Thuỵ is crowned emperor of Vietnam, the country's last monarch.
  1926   – Abdul-Aziz ibn Saud is crowned King of Hejaz.
1936 – Kashf-e hijab decree is made and immediately enforced by Reza Shah, Iran's head of state, banning the wearing of Islamic veils in public.
1940 – World War II: Britain introduces food rationing.
1945 – World War II: Philippine Commonwealth troops under the Philippine Commonwealth Army units enter the province of Ilocos Sur in Northern Luzon and attack invading Japanese Imperial forces.
1946 – Andrei Zhdanov, Chairman of the Finnish Allied Commission, submitted to the Finnish War Criminal Court an interrogation report by General Erich Buschenhagen, a German prisoner of war, on the contacts between Finnish and German military personnel before the Continuation War and a copy of Hitler's Barbarossa plan.
1956 – Operation Auca: Five U.S. missionaries are killed by the Huaorani of Ecuador shortly after making first contact.
1959 – Charles de Gaulle is proclaimed as the first President of the French Fifth Republic.
1961 – In France a referendum supports Charles de Gaulle's policies in Algeria.
1964 – President Lyndon B. Johnson declares a "War on Poverty" in the United States.
1972 – Bowing to international pressure, President of Pakistan Zulfikar Ali Bhutto releases Bengali leader Sheikh Mujibur Rahman from prison, who had been arrested after declaring the independence of Bangladesh.
1973 – Soviet space mission Luna 21 is launched.
  1973   – Watergate scandal: The trial of seven men accused of illegal entry into Democratic Party headquarters at Watergate begins.
1975 – Ella T. Grasso becomes Governor of Connecticut, the first woman to serve as a Governor in the United States other than by succeeding her husband.
1977 – Three bombs explode in Moscow, Russia, Soviet Union, within 37 minutes, killing seven. The bombings are attributed to an Armenian separatist group. 
1981 – A local farmer reports a UFO sighting in Trans-en-Provence, France, claimed to be "perhaps the most completely and carefully documented sighting of all time".
1982 – Breakup of the Bell System: In the United States, AT&T agrees to divest itself of twenty-two subdivisions.
1989 – Kegworth air disaster: British Midland Flight 92, a Boeing 737-400, crashes into the M1 motorway, killing 47 of the 126 people on board.
1994 – Russian cosmonaut Valeri Polyakov on Soyuz TM-18 leaves for Mir. He would stay on the space station until March 22, 1995, for a record 437 days in space.
1996 – An Antonov An-32 cargo aircraft crashes into a crowded market in Kinshasa, Zaire, killing up to 223 people on the ground; two of six crew members are also killed.
2002 – President of the United States George W. Bush signs into law the No Child Left Behind Act.
2003 – Turkish Airlines Flight 634 crashes near Diyarbakır Airport, Turkey, killing the entire crew and 70 of the 75 passengers.
  2003   – Air Midwest Flight 5481 crashes at Charlotte-Douglas Airport, in Charlotte, North Carolina, killing all 21 people on board.
2004 – The , then the largest ocean liner ever built, is christened by her namesake's granddaughter, Queen Elizabeth II.
2005 – The nuclear sub  collides at full speed with an undersea mountain south of Guam. One man is killed, but the sub surfaces and is repaired.
2009 – A 6.1-magnitude earthquake in northern Costa Rica kills 15 people and injures 32.
2010 – Gunmen from an offshoot of the Front for the Liberation of the Enclave of Cabinda attack a bus carrying the Togo national football team on its way to the 2010 Africa Cup of Nations, killing three people and injuring another nine.
2011 – Sitting US Congresswoman Gabby Giffords is shot in the head along with 18 others in a mass shooting in Tucson, Arizona. Giffords survived the assassination attempt, but six others died, including John Roll, a federal judge.
2016 – Joaquín Guzmán, widely regarded as the world's most powerful drug trafficker, is recaptured following his escape from a maximum security prison in Mexico.
  2016   – West Air Sweden Flight 294 crashes near the Swedish reservoir of Akkajaure; both pilots, the only people on board, are killed.
2020 – Ukraine International Airlines Flight 752 crashes immediately after takeoff at Tehran Imam Khomeini International Airport; all 176 on board are killed. The plane was shot down by an Iranian anti-aircraft missile.
2021 – Twenty-three people are killed in what is described as a police ″massacre″ in La Vega, Caracas, Venezuela.
2023 – Supporters of former Brazil president Jair Bolsonaro storm the Brazilian Congress.

Births

Pre-1600
1037 – Su Dongpo, Chinese calligrapher and poet (d. 1101)
1345 – Kadi Burhan al-Din, poet, kadi, and ruler of Sivas (d. 1398) 
1529 – John Frederick II, duke of Saxony (d. 1595)
1583 – Simon Episcopius, Dutch theologian and academic (d. 1643)
1587 – Johannes Fabricius, German astronomer and academic (d. 1616)
  1587   – Jan Pieterszoon Coen, Governor-General of the Dutch East Indies (d. 1629)
1589 – Ivan Gundulić, Croatian poet and playwright (d. 1638)

1601–1900
1601 – Baltasar Gracián, Spanish priest and author (d. 1658)
1628 – François-Henri de Montmorency, duc de Luxembourg, French general (d. 1695)
1632 – Samuel von Pufendorf, German economist and jurist (d. 1694)
1635 – Luis Manuel Fernández de Portocarrero, Spanish cardinal (d. 1709)
1638 – Elisabetta Sirani, Italian painter (d. 1665)
1735 – John Carroll, American archbishop, founder of Georgetown University (d. 1815)
1763 – Edmond-Charles Genêt, French-American translator and diplomat (d. 1834)
1786 – Nicholas Biddle, American banker and financier (d. 1844)
1788 – Rudolf of Austria, Austrian archduke and archbishop (d. 1831)
1792 – Lowell Mason, American composer and educator (d. 1872)
1805 – John Bigler, American lawyer, politician, and diplomat, 3rd Governor of California (d. 1871)
  1805   – Orson Hyde, American religious leader, 3rd President of the Quorum of the Twelve Apostles (d. 1878)
1812 – Sigismond Thalberg, Swiss pianist and composer (d. 1871)
1817 – Theophilus Shepstone, English-South African politician (d. 1893)
1821 – James Longstreet, American general and diplomat, United States Ambassador to Turkey (d. 1904)
1823 – Alfred Russel Wallace, Welsh geographer, biologist, and explorer (d. 1913)
1824 – Wilkie Collins, English novelist, playwright, and short story writer (d. 1889)
  1824   – Francisco González Bocanegra, Mexican poet and composer (d. 1861)
1830 – Hans von Bülow, German pianist and composer (d. 1894)
1836 – Lawrence Alma-Tadema, Dutch-English painter and academic (d. 1912)
1843 – Frederick Abberline, English police officer (d. 1929)
1852 – James Milton Carroll, American pastor and author (d. 1931)
1859 – Fanny Bullock Workman, American mountaineer, geographer, and cartographer (d. 1925)
1860 – Emma Booth-Tucker, English author (d. 1903)
1862 – Frank Nelson Doubleday, American publisher, founded the Doubleday Publishing Company (d. 1934)
1864 – Prince Albert Victor, Duke of Clarence and Avondale (d. 1892)
1865 – Winnaretta Singer, American philanthropist (d. 1943)
1866 – William G. Conley, American educator and politician, 18th Governor of West Virginia (d. 1940)
1867 – Emily Greene Balch, American economist and author, Nobel Prize laureate (d. 1961)
1870 – Miguel Primo de Rivera, Spanish general and politician, Prime Minister of Spain (d. 1930)
1871 – James Craig, 1st Viscount Craigavon, Irish captain and politician, 1st Prime Minister of Northern Ireland (d. 1940)
1873 – Iuliu Maniu, Romanian lawyer and politician, 32nd Prime Minister of Romania (d. 1953)
1881 – Henrik Shipstead, American dentist and politician (d. 1960)
  1881   – Linnie Marsh Wolfe, American librarian and author (d. 1945)
1883 – Pavel Filonov, Russian painter and poet (d. 1941)
  1883   – Patrick J. Hurley, American general, politician, and diplomat, 51st United States Secretary of War (d. 1963)
1885 – John Curtin, Australian journalist and politician, 14th Prime Minister of Australia (d. 1945)
  1885   – Mór Kóczán, Hungarian javelin thrower and pastor (d. 1972)
  1885   – A. J. Muste, Dutch-American pastor and activist (d. 1967)
1888 – Richard Courant, German-American mathematician and academic (d. 1972)
1891 – Walther Bothe, German physicist and academic, Nobel Prize laureate (d. 1957)
  1891   – Storm Jameson, English journalist and author (d. 1986)
  1891   – Bronislava Nijinska, Russian dancer and choreographer (d. 1972)
1896 – Jaromír Weinberger, Czech-American composer and academic (d. 1967)
1897 – Dennis Wheatley, English soldier and author (d. 1977)
1899 – S. W. R. D. Bandaranaike, Sri Lankan lawyer and politician, 4th Prime Minister of Sri Lanka (d. 1959)
1900 – Dorothy Adams, American character actress (d. 1988) 
  1900   – Serge Poliakoff, Russian-French painter (d. 1969)

1901–present
1902 – Carl Rogers, American psychologist and academic (d. 1987)
1904 – Karl Brandt, German physician and SS officer (d. 1948)
1905 – Carl Gustav Hempel, German philosopher from the Vienna and the Berlin Circle (d. 1997)
1908 – Fearless Nadia, Australian-Indian actress and stuntwoman (d. 1996)
1908 – William Hartnell, English actor (d. 1975)
1909 – Ashapoorna Devi, Indian author and poet (d. 1995)
  1909   – Bruce Mitchell, South African cricketer (d. 1995)
  1909   – Evelyn Wood, American author and educator (d. 1995) 
1910 – Galina Ulanova, Russian actress and ballerina (d. 1998)
1911 – Gypsy Rose Lee, American actress, dancer, and author (d. 1970)
1912 – José Ferrer, Puerto Rican-American actor and director (d. 1992)
  1912   – Lawrence Walsh, Canadian-American lawyer, judge, and politician, 4th United States Deputy Attorney General (d. 2014)
1915 – Walker Cooper, American baseball player and manager (d. 1991)
1917 – Peter Matthew Hillsman Taylor, American novelist, short story writer, and playwright (d. 1994)
1922 – Dale D. Myers, American engineer (d. 2015)
1923 – Larry Storch, American actor and comedian(d. 2022)
  1923   – Giorgio Tozzi, American opera singer and actor (d. 2011)
  1923   – Johnny Wardle, English cricketer (d. 1985)
  1923   – Joseph Weizenbaum, German-American computer scientist and author (d. 2008)
1924 – Benjamin Lees, Chinese-American soldier and composer (d. 2010)
  1924   – Ron Moody, English actor and singer (d. 2015)
1925 – Mohan Rakesh, Indian author and playwright (d. 1972)
1926 – Evelyn Lear, American operatic soprano (d. 2012)
  1926   – Kerwin Mathews, American actor (d. 2007)
  1926   – Kelucharan Mohapatra, Indian dancer and choreographer (d. 2004)
  1926   – Hanae Mori, Japanese fashion designer (d. 2022)
  1926   – Soupy Sales, American comedian and actor (d. 2009)
1927 – Charles Tomlinson, English poet and academic (d. 2015)
1928 – Slade Gorton, American colonel, lawyer, and politician, 14th Attorney General of Washington (d. 2020)
1929 – Saeed Jaffrey, Indian-British actor (d. 2015)
1931 – Bill Graham, German-American businessman (d. 1991)
  1931   – Clarence Benjamin Jones, American lawyer and scholar
1933 – Charles Osgood, American soldier and journalist
  1933   – Jean-Marie Straub, French director and screenwriter (d. 2022)
1934 – Jacques Anquetil, French cyclist (d. 1987)
  1934   – Roy Kinnear, British actor (d. 1988)
1935 – Elvis Presley, American singer, guitarist, and actor (d. 1977)
1936 – Robert May, Baron May of Oxford, Australian-English zoologist, ecologist, and academic (d. 2020)
1937 – Shirley Bassey, Welsh singer
1938 – Bob Eubanks, American game show host and producer
1939 – Carolina Herrera, Venezuelan-American fashion designer
1940 – Cristy Lane, American country and gospel singer
1941 – Graham Chapman, English actor and screenwriter (d. 1989)
1942 – Stephen Hawking, English physicist and author (d. 2018)
  1942   – Junichirō Koizumi, Japanese politician, 56th Prime Minister of Japan
  1942   – Yvette Mimieux, American actress (d. 2022)
1944 – Terry Brooks, American lawyer and author
1945 – Nancy Bond, American author and academic
  1945   – Phil Beal, English footballer
1946 – Robby Krieger, American guitarist and songwriter 
  1946   – Miguel Ángel Félix Gallardo, Mexican drug lord
1947 – David Bowie, English singer-songwriter, producer, and actor (d. 2016)
  1947   – Antti Kalliomäki, Finnish pole vaulter and politician
1948 – Gillies MacKinnon, Scottish director and screenwriter
1949 – Lawrence Rowe, Jamaican cricketer
1951 – Kenny Anthony, Saint Lucian politician, 5th Prime Minister of Saint Lucia
1952 – Vladimir Feltsman, Russian-American pianist and educator
  1952   – Peter McCullagh, Irish mathematician and academic
1953 – Bruce Sutter, American baseball pitcher (d. 2022)
1955 – Mike Reno, Canadian singer and drummer
1957 – Nacho Duato, Spanish dancer and choreographer
1958 – Betsy DeVos, American businesswoman and politician, 11th Secretary of Education
  1958  – Rey Misterio, Mexican wrestler, trainer, and actor
1959 – Paul Hester, Australian drummer (d. 2005)
1960 – Dave Weckl, American drummer
1961 – Calvin Smith, American sprinter
1964 – Ron Sexsmith, Canadian singer-songwriter
1966 – Willie Anderson, American basketball player
  1966   – Igor Vyazmikin, Russian ice hockey player (d. 2009)
  1966   – Andrew Wood, American singer-songwriter (d. 1990)
1967 – R. Kelly, American singer-songwriter, record producer, and former professional basketball player
  1967   – Tom Watson, English politician
1971 – Jason Giambi, American baseball player
  1971   – Pascal Zuberbühler, Swiss footballer and coach
1972 – Paul Clement, English footballer, coach, and manager
1973 – Mike Cameron, American baseball player
1977 – Amber Benson, American actress, writer, director, and producer
1978 – Marco Fu, Hong Kongese snooker player
1979 – Seol Ki-hyeon, South Korean footballer and manager
  1979   – Adrian Mutu, Romanian footballer
  1979   – Stipe Pletikosa, Croatian footballer
  1979   – Sarah Polley, Canadian actress and director
1981 – Jeff Francis, Canadian baseball player
1982 – Gaby Hoffmann, American actress
  1982   – Kim Jong-un, North Korean soldier and politician, 3rd Supreme Leader of North Korea
1988 – Adrián López, Spanish footballer
  1988   – Michael Mancienne, English footballer
  1988   – Alex Tyus, American-Israeli basketball player
1989 – Aaron Cruden, New Zealand rugby player
1991 – Josh Hazlewood, Australian cricketer
  1991   – Stefan Johansen, Norwegian footballer
  1991   – Stefan Savić, Montenegrin footballer
1992 – Stefanie Dolson, American basketball player
  1992   – Koke, Spanish footballer
1993 – Sophie Pascoe, New Zealand swimmer
1999 – Damiano David, Italian singer-songwriter
2000 – Noah Cyrus, American singer, songwriter, and actress

Deaths

Pre-1600
 307 – Hui of Jin, Chinese emperor (b. 259)
 482 – Severinus of Noricum, Italian apostle and saint
 871 – Bagsecg, Viking warrior and leader
 926 – Athelm, archbishop of Canterbury
1079 – Adèle of France, countess of Flanders (b. 1009)
1107 – Edgar, King of Scotland (b. 1074)
1198 – Celestine III, pope of the Catholic Church (b. 1106)
1337 – Giotto, Italian painter and architect, designed Scrovegni Chapel and Giotto's Campanile (b. 1266)
1354 – Charles de la Cerda, French nobleman (b. 1327)
1424 – Stephen Zaccaria, archbishop of Patras
1456 – Lawrence Giustiniani, Italian bishop and saint (b. 1381)
1538 – Beatrice of Portugal, duchess of Savoy (b. 1504)
1557 – Albert Alcibiades, margrave of Brandenburg-Kulmbach (b. 1522)
1570 – Philibert de l'Orme, French sculptor and architect, designed the Château d'Anet (b. 1510)
1598 – John George, Elector of Brandenburg (b. 1525)

1601–1900
1642 – Galileo Galilei, Italian physicist, mathematician, astronomer, and philosopher (b. 1564)
1707 – John Dalrymple, 1st Earl of Stair, Scottish soldier and politician, Scottish Secretary of State (b. 1648)
1713 – Arcangelo Corelli, Italian violinist and composer (b. 1653)
1775 – John Baskerville, English printer and type designer (b. 1706)
1794 – Justus Möser, German lawyer and jurist (b. 1720)
1815 – Edward Pakenham, Anglo-Irish general and politician (b. 1778)
1825 – Eli Whitney, American engineer and theorist, invented the cotton gin (b. 1765)
1854 – William Beresford, 1st Viscount Beresford, English field marshal and politician, Lieutenant-General of the Ordnance (b. 1768)
1865 – Aimé, duc de Clermont-Tonnerre, French general and politician, French Minister of Defence (b. 1779)
1874 – Charles Étienne Brasseur de Bourbourg, French historian and archaeologist (b. 1814)
1878 – Nikolay Nekrasov, Russian poet and critic (b. 1821)
1880 – Emperor Norton, English-American businessman (b. 1811)
1883 – Miska Magyarics, Slovene-Hungarian poet (b. 1825)
1896 – William Rainey Marshall, American banker and politician, 5th Governor of Minnesota (b. 1825)
  1896   – Paul Verlaine, French poet and writer (b. 1844)

1901–present
1914 – Simon Bolivar Buckner, American general and 30th Governor of Kentucky (b. 1823)
1916 – Rembrandt Bugatti, Italian sculptor (b. 1884)
  1916   – Ada Rehan, Irish-American actress (b. 1860)
1918 – Ellis H. Roberts, American journalist and politician, 20th Treasurer of the United States (b. 1827)
1920 – Josef Josephi, Polish-born singer and actor (b.1852)
1925 – George Bellows, American painter (b.1882)
1934 – Andrei Bely, Russian novelist, poet, and critic (b. 1880)
  1934   – Alexandre Stavisky, Ukrainian-French financier (b. 1886)
1938 – Johnny Gruelle, American author and illustrator (b. 1880)
1941 – Robert Baden-Powell, 1st Baron Baden-Powell, English general and founder of the Scout movement (b. 1857)
1942 – Joseph Franklin Rutherford, American lawyer and religious leader (b. 1869)
1943 – Andres Larka, Estonian general and politician, 1st Estonian Minister of War (b. 1879)
1944 – William Kissam Vanderbilt II, American lieutenant and sailor (b. 1878)
1945 – Karl Ernst Krafft, Swiss astrologer and author (b. 1900)
1948 – Kurt Schwitters, German painter and graphic designer (b. 1887)
1950 – Joseph Schumpeter, Czech-American economist and academic (b. 1883)
1952 – Antonia Maury, American astronomer and astrophysicist (b. 1866)
1953 – Hugh Binney, English admiral and politician, 16th Governor of Tasmania (b. 1883)
1954 – Eduard Wiiralt, Estonian-French painter and illustrator (b. 1898)
1958 – Mary Colter, American architect, designed the Desert View Watchtower (b. 1869)
1961 – Schoolboy Rowe, American baseball player and coach (b. 1910)
1963 – Kay Sage, American painter (b. 1898)
1975 – Richard Tucker, American operatic tenor (b. 1913)
1976 – Zhou Enlai, Chinese soldier and politician, 1st Premier of the People's Republic of China (b. 1898)
1980 – John Mauchly, American physicist and academic (b. 1907)
1982 – Grégoire Aslan, Swiss-English actor and screenwriter (b. 1908)
1983 – Gerhard Barkhorn, German general and pilot (b. 1919)
1986 – Pierre Fournier, French cellist and educator (b. 1906)
1990 – Bernard Krigstein, American illustrator (b. 1919)
  1990   – Terry-Thomas, English actor and comedian (b. 1911)
1991 – Steve Clark, English singer-songwriter and guitarist (b. 1960)
1994 – Pat Buttram, American actor and comedian (b. 1915)
  1994   – Harvey Haddix, American baseball player and coach (b. 1925)
1996 – Metin Göktepe, Turkish photographer and journalist (b. 1968)
  1996   – François Mitterrand, French sergeant and politician, 21st President of France (b. 1916)
1997 – Melvin Calvin, American chemist and academic, Nobel Prize laureate (b. 1911)
1998 – Michael Tippett, English composer and conductor (b. 1905)
2002 – Alexander Prokhorov, Australian-Russian physicist and academic, Nobel Prize laureate (b. 1916)
  2002   – Dave Thomas, American businessman and philanthropist, founded Wendy's (b. 1932)
2003 – Ron Goodwin, English composer and conductor (b. 1925)
2006 – Tony Banks, Baron Stratford, Northern Irish broadcaster and politician, Minister for Sport and the Olympics (b. 1943)
2007 – Jane Bolin, American lawyer and judge (b. 1908)
  2007   – Arthur Cockfield, Baron Cockfield, English lawyer and politician, Secretary of State for Business, Innovation and Skills (b. 1916)
  2007   – Yvonne De Carlo, Canadian-American actress and singer (b. 1922)
  2007   – David Ervine, Northern Irish politician and activist (b. 1953)
  2007   – Iwao Takamoto, American animator, director, and producer (b. 1925)
2008 – George Moore, Australian jockey and trainer (b. 1923)
2009 – Lasantha Wickrematunge, Sri Lankan journalist (b. 1958)
2010 – Art Clokey, American animator, director, producer, and screenwriter (b. 1921)
2011 – Jiří Dienstbier, Czech journalist and politician (b. 1937)
  2011   – Thorbjørn Svenssen, Norwegian footballer (b. 1924)
2012 – Dave Alexander, American singer and pianist (b. 1938)
  2012   – T. J. Hamblin, English haematologist and academic (b. 1943)
  2012   – Alexis Weissenberg, Bulgarian-French pianist and educator (b. 1929) 
2013 – Kenojuak Ashevak, Canadian sculptor and illustrator (b. 1927)
  2013   – Jeanne Manford, American educator and activist, co-founded PFLAG (b. 1920)
  2013   – Alasdair Milne, Indian-English director and producer (b. 1930)
2014 – Irma Heijting-Schuhmacher, Dutch-Australian swimmer (b. 1925)
  2014   – Antonino P. Roman, Filipino lawyer and politician (b. 1939)
2015 – Andraé Crouch, American singer-songwriter, producer, and pastor (b. 1942)
  2015   – Kep Enderby, Australian lawyer, judge, and politician, 23rd Attorney-General for Australia (b. 1926)
  2015   – Patsy Garrett, American actress and singer (b. 1921)
2016 – Maria Teresa de Filippis, Italian racing driver (b. 1926)
  2016   – German Moreno, Filipino television host, actor, comedian and talent manager (b. 1933)
2017 – Nicolai Gedda, Swedish operatic tenor (b. 1925)
  2017   – James Mancham, Seychellois politician, President 1976-77 (b. 1939)
  2017   – Akbar Hashemi Rafsanjani, Iranian politician (b. 1934) 
  2017   – Peter Sarstedt, Indian-British singer-songwriter and guitarist (b. 1941)
2020 – Pat Dalton, Australian footballer (b. 1942)
  2020   – Buck Henry, American actor, screenwriter, and director (b. 1930)
2021 – Iancu Țucărman, Romanian Holocaust survivor (b. 1922)
2022 – Michael Lang, American concert promoter and producer (b. 1944)

Holidays and observances
Babinden (Belarus, Russia)
Christian feast day:
Abo of Tiflis
Apollinaris Claudius
Blessed Eurosia Fabris
Gauchito Gil (Folk Catholicism) 
Gudula
Harriet Bedell (Episcopal Church (USA))
Lawrence Giustiniani
Lucian of Beauvais
Maximus of Pavia
Our Lady of Prompt Succor (Roman Catholic Church)
Pega (Anglican and Roman Catholic churches)
Severinus of Noricum
Thorfinn of Hamar
January 8 (Eastern Orthodox liturgics)
Commonwealth Day (Northern Mariana Islands)
Earliest day on which Children's Day can fall, while January 14 is the latest; celebrated on the second Saturday in January. (Thailand)
Typing Day (International observance)

References

External links

 BBC: On This Day
 
 Historical Events on January 8

Days of the year
January